Martin West (born Martin Weixelbaum; August 28, 1937 – December 31, 2019),  was an American actor of film and television best known for playing the grieving father Lawson in John Carpenter's Assault on Precinct 13 and the lead role in Freckles.

West played doctor Phil Brewer in General Hospital and Don Hughes in As the World Turns. His work also includes appearances in films including Soldier Blue and Mac and Me and as guest star in television programs including Perry Mason,  Gunsmoke, The Lieutenant, Rango, The Invaders, Have Gun Will Travel, and Matlock. West's final TV acting appearance was in an episode of The New Adam-12 before being retired from acting in 1990.

On Broadway, West portrayed a Union soldier in The Andersonville Trial (1959).

After he moved to Westport, Connecticut, West acted and directed with the Theatre Artists Workshop and produced a documentary about older artists from that area.

In 1967, West married Carol A. Heller and remained wed until her death in 1971. Marrying Carolyn K. Barsky in 1975, West had his first of three children. The two later divorced in 1979.

On New Years Eve 1980, West married actress Suzie Galler after meeting her on the set of Der Preis fürs Überleben, a film in which they co-starred. They had two children together before making the move from Los Angeles to Connecticut in 1993, ultimately divorcing in 1997. The following year, West met artist Ann Chernow at a mutual friend's party. Ann remained his partner until his death.

On December 31, 2019, West died in Norwalk Hospital at age 82.

Filmography

References

External links
 
 
 Martin West at Aveleyman

1937 births
2019 deaths
20th-century American male actors
American male film actors
American male stage actors
American male television actors
Male actors from New York (state)
People from Southampton (town), New York